Ana Nikolić (born 27 September 1978) is a Serbian singer. Born in Jagodina and raised in Paraćin, she rose to prominence at the Beovizija 2003 music festival with the song "Januar". Nikolić has to date released six studio albums: Januar (2003), Devojka od čokolade (2006), Mafia caffe (2010), Milion dolara (2013), Labilna (2016) and Klinika (2020)

Early life 
Ana Nikolić was born on September 27, 1978, in Jagodina, but grew up in Paraćin. She has a brother, Marko Nikolić, who worked as her manager. After graduating from grammar school, Nikolić moved to Belgrade where she attended secondary polytechnic school, studying design. It was also reported that she studied music at the Academy of Arts, Berlin. 

In 1998, Ana lost her father, whom she dedicated her 2016 song "Da te vratim" to. According to her, the loss of her father also stimulated her to become more independent and to start performing professionally. She left Serbia during 1999 bombing and went to Greece, where she lived for 9 months. There, Ana attended the performance of Sakis Rouvas, who according to her made a further influence on her music career.

Career 
In 1998, Nikolić made her first television appearance on the show 3K Dur, where she sang "Kolačići" by Denis & Denis. In April 2003, she rose to prominence by competing on the national selection competition for the Eurovision Song Contest, called Beovizija, with her entry "Januar". Despite placing 7th, Nikolić received the award for the best debut performance. Subsequently, in August, she released her debut studio album through City Records under her then stage name Nika. The album also marked the beginning of her collaboration with songwriters Marina Tucaković and Aleksandar Milić Mili. In 2006, Nikolić returned to Beovizija with "Romale romali", finishing as the runner-up. The song received significant success and has become Nikolic's signature hit. The same year, she also released her sophomore album, Devojka od čokolade, after which she embarked on her first regional tour. Nikolić competed on Beovizija once again in March 2009, where she reached the final only after the statement that the votes had been miscounted. Nikolić subsequently decided to not take part in the final and later sued Radio Television of Serbia. In October 2014, she claimed victory over Serbian public broadcaster and received €20,000 in damages. In September 2009, she entered Serbian reality television show Farma, but was disqualified after three days for rule breaking. Her third body of work, Mafia Caffe, was released in July 2010.

In the summer of 2013, she released Milion dolara with several stand out hits, such as the title track featuring Nikolija and "Đavo". Nikolic's fifth album, Labilna, was released in May 2016. Produced by hip hop artists Rasta and Coby, it saw significant departure from her previous work to a more urban sound. Same year, she went on to appear as a judge on the fifth season of the Serbian spin-off of the Got Talent franchise, alongside Rasta who was her husband at the time. The couple also collaborated on "Slučajnost", which was released in June 2017 and was later included to Rasta's album Indigo. After giving birth to her daughter in August 2017, Nikolić decided to take a break from music to focus on motherhood and her body image issue regarding a highly publicized weight gain.

In February 2020, Nikolić returned to public life by releasing "Bilo je lepo" followed by music videos for six other songs, which were all supposed to be a part of the album titled Klinika. The album was, however, eventually scrapped due to COVID-19 pandemic. By the end of 2022, Nikolić announced her first solo concert in the Belgrade Arena for 7 October 2023 to celebrate twenty years of career.

Controversy 
In November 2010, Nikolić was detained in a police station in Rakovica for driving under influence.

Following the Fukushima nuclear disaster in 2011, Nikolić claimed she was foster caring a Japanese baby boy. She subsequently faced scrutiny after Serbian daily newspaper Kurir had reported that the baby was in fact Chinese from a family residing in New Belgrade. Nikolić firmly denied the allegations, stating that the baby's parents decided to come "as soon as possible" to take him back to Japan since the media scandal had erupted.

In June 2022, she was caught up in another media scandal when she released her demo of the song "Provereno", which had already been released by Milica Pavlović as a part of her album Posesivna. Pavlović disclosed her intentions to file a lawsuit against Nikolić several days after. No legal actions were eventually taken regarding the incident.

In August 2022, Nikolić was condemned for her homophobic statements about the EuroPride event in Belgrade, saying that she, "like the Church", disapproves pride parades. Nikolić subsequently stated that she has never "turned her back" on the LGBT community.

Personal life 
While working on her 2016 album, Nikolić started dating Serbian record producer and artist Stefan Đurić Rasta. They married on July 28, 2016. Nikolić gave birth to daughter Tara on 3 August 2017. The couple filled for a divorce in November 2018.

Discography 
Studio albums
 Januar (2003)
 Devojka od čokolade (2006)
 Mafia caffé (2010)
 Milion dolara (2013)
 Labilna (2016)
 Klinika (2020)

Non-album singles
 Ekstaza (2008)
 Šizofrenija (2008) feat. Aca Lukas
 Bili smo najlepši (2009)
 Voli me, voli me (2015)
 Slučajnost (2017) feat. Rasta
 Prolazi (2021)
 Nevina i kriva (2023)

See also 
Music of Serbia

References

External links 

1978 births
Living people
21st-century Serbian women singers
Serbian pop singers
Serbian folk-pop singers
People from Paraćin
Beovizija contestants